Deon Stewardson (11 October 1951 – 27 October 2017) was a British-South African actor best known for his role as Anders Du Plessis in the ITV Drama series Wild at Heart. The seven series were popular in the United Kingdom with television viewing figures between 7.5 million and 10 million.  The last series was recorded in 2011 with a Christmas Special. He worked alongside many well known actors including Hayley Mills. Stewardson and his partner Marianne would live in the Hartbeespoort Dam area of South Africa during the six months filming. He had a passion for wildlife and his character known as "Dup" worked perfectly for him. As well as this role he has taken on a number of minor roles in many different genres, including The Foster Gang. Stewardson has also starred in films, most notably Lethal Woman.

Deon was the son of South African actor Joe Stewardson and brother of the late Matthew Stewardson who appeared in Idols South Africa (season 1)

Death
On the morning of 28 October 2017 a local outlet reported Stewardson had been found dead in the bathroom at a Graaff-Reinet accommodation establishment the previous afternoon, with police confirming it as suicide. Stewardson is survived by his partner Marianne Meijer, sister Sheryl and half siblings Joanne and Sean. By his request there was no funeral and his family and friends arranged a 'get-together' to remember him on the day of the cremation.

Filmography and Television appearances

References

1951 births
2017 deaths
South African male television actors
South African male film actors